Charles Hussey may refer to:

Sir Charles Hussey, 1st Baronet (1626–1664), English politician
Sir Charles Hussey, 2nd Baronet (died 1680) of the Hussey baronets
Charles Henry Hussey (1832–1899), South Australian politician